Adeimantus, son of Leucolophides, an Athenian, was one of the commanders with Alcibiades in the expedition against Andros in 407 BC.  He was again appointed one of the Athenian generals after the Battle of Arginusae in 406, and continued in office until the Battle of Aegospotami in 404, where he was one of the commanders, and was taken prisoner.  He was the only one of the Athenian prisoners who was not put to death, because he had opposed the decree for cutting off the right hands of the Lacedaemonians who might be taken in the battle.  He was accused by many of treachery in this battle, and was afterwards impeached by Conon.  Aristophanes speaks of Adeimantus in The Frogs, which was acted in the year of the battle, as one whose death was wished for; and he also calls him, apparently out of jest, the son of Leucolophus, that is, "White Crest".  In Plato's Protagoras, Adeimantus is also spoken of as present on that occasion.

References

Sources

Ancient Athenian generals
Athenians of the Peloponnesian War
5th-century BC Athenians